The Forlì Open is a professional tennis tournament played annually on outdoor clay courts of the Carpena Tennis Club, in Forlì, Italy since 2022. It is currently part of the ATP Challenger Tour.

Past finals

Singles

Doubles

References

ATP Challenger Tour
 
Clay court tennis tournaments
Tennis tournaments in Italy
Forlì